Field of Dreams is a baseball field and pop-culture tourist attraction built for the 1989 movie of the same name. It is located in Dyersville, Iowa, within Dubuque County.

Site history
Universal Pictures built the baseball diamond in 1988 on two farms a few miles outside Dyersville, Iowa, for the 1989 film Field of Dreams. When production completed, the baseball diamond created for the movie was left behind. Most of the baseball field, including the diamond and the adjacent house, was on a farm owned by the Lansing family, but the left and center field were on an adjacent property owned by the Ameskamp family. The field was built across the two properties because the producers wanted to place the field in a location where sunset shots would have a clear line-of-sight.

After filming completed, the Lansing family kept their portion of the field intact and added a small hut where visitors could buy souvenirs. The Ameskamp family returned their land to farming for a year, but then restored the remainder of the field and opened up their own souvenir stand. The two owners had operated separate tourist facilities and had also been at odds regarding commercialization of the site.

In 1990, Keith Rahe, a neighboring farmer, put together a baseball team dubbed the "Ghost Players" to entertain the visitors at the field. The team's presence at the field on Sunday afternoons once a month attracted thousands of additional fans to the field. In 1991 and 1992, the Upper Deck Company sponsored a celebrity game at the field. Executive producer Tony Loiacono, who later received the key to the city, brought Hall of Famers like Bob Gibson, Reggie Jackson and Bob Feller to take on Hollywood stars like Kelsey Grammer and Meat Loaf in a charity game. The two games raised over $100,000 for local charities.

A 2002 book by author Brett H. MandelIs This Heaven? The Magic of the Field of Dreamschronicles the story of how the once make-believe location has been turned into a real and tangible place that beckons people from across the world. The book, which has also been translated into Japanese, "offers readers a glimpse of this slice of heaven here on Earth and shows how it continues to affect people who step between the chalk lines."

Rolling Roadshow 

On August 11, 2006, Austin, Texas' Alamo Drafthouse "Rolling Roadshow" (which screens films in locations unique to each film) showed Field of Dreams at the Field of Dreams site in Dyersville. A giant, outdoor screen was set up adjacent to the field with seating, concession, and parking along left and center field. Only the property owned by the Ameskamp family was allowed to be used for this event; the Lansing property was closed to the public. Before the screening of the film, Kevin Costner and his band (unnamed at the time, now known as Kevin Costner and Modern West) performed for two hours for the attending crowd of close to 1,000 people. Costner and his band played a selection of original songs and popular covers, including a song about Iowa that he wrote during the filming of Field of Dreams 17 years earlier. The event was sponsored by a DVD rental company and hosted by Lisa Loeb.

Consolidation of land and Go the Distance operation 
In August 2007, Rita Ameskamp sold the land containing her portion of the baseball field to Don and Becky Lansing – the owners of the remainder of the field. As a result, the movie site was, for the first time, entirely owned by the Lansing family. On May 13, 2010, the Lansings announced they were putting the farm used for the movie up for sale. On October 30, 2011, it was reported that a sale had been agreed upon with a private partnership called Go the Distance Baseball, headed by Denise Stillman, who died, aged 46, in 2018 from a rare form of liver cancer. Go the Distance has owned and preserved the movie site since December 28, 2012.

Under Go the Distance, new events have been held at the venue. The Ghost Players returned in 2013. Over Father's Day weekend 2014, the field was home to a series of events to commemorate its 25th anniversary, including an exhibition game featuring Kevin Costner, Dwier Brown and others. The events drew an estimated 12,000 fans.

Under new ownership, visitor traffic has increased from 65,000 to 100,000 visitors per year, according to Go the Distance. Additionally, in March 2018, Go the Distance began renting the house and ballfield to tourists at a cost of $2,200 per night on weekdays and $2,500 per night on weekends.

Additional development
Not long after buying the movie site, Go the Distance Baseball announced plans for a 24-field youth baseball and softball complex known as All-Star Ballpark Heaven. The project was initially intended to open in 2014, coinciding with the film's 25th anniversary, but confronted difficulties finding funding and legal action from neighboring property owners, who objected to the commercial re-zoning of the site. Additionally, the cost has ballooned from the initially proposed $38 million to more than $70 million; while the Iowa state legislature passed a tax incentive for the project, developers failed to meet deadlines to secure it.

On September 30, 2021, Go The Distance Baseball announced in a press release that Frank Thomas purchased a controlling interest in Go The Distance Baseball LLC.

MLB at Field of Dreams

The contest was originally scheduled for August 13, 2020, between the Chicago White Sox and New York Yankees. Due to the COVID-19 pandemic, the game was rescheduled to August 12, 2021. The game resulted in a 9–8 win by the White Sox over the Yankees. After the game drew the highest regular season ratings in 16 years, MLB announced it would return the following year for a contest between the Cincinnati Reds and Chicago Cubs. However, Frank Thomas later indicated that no game will be played in 2023 because of the upcoming construction that is scheduled to take place on the site, although there is a possibility of MLB resuming the series in future seasons.

MLB The Show has delivered an interactive version of the Field of Dreams in MLB The Show 21, including dynamic cornfields that can be placed at will by the user.

Dimensions and capacity
With additional temporary bleachers, the venue held nearly 6,000 spectators for the 2013 Team of Dreams celebrity game.

Gallery

References

External links

 The website from the Lansing family, 
 Kevin Costner returns to Field of Dreams. Netflix sponsored an outdoor showing of Field of Dreams at the namesake Iowa ballfield on August 11, 2006. Kevin Costner, star of the movie, appeared in person.
 Field of Dreams Movie Site at Google Maps

1988 establishments in Iowa
Baseball culture
Baseball venues in Iowa
Buildings and structures in Dubuque County, Iowa
Landmarks in Iowa
Roadside attractions in Iowa
Sports venues completed in 1988
Tourist attractions in Dubuque County, Iowa